Ponedera is a municipality and town in the Colombian department of Atlántico.

References

External links
 Gobernacion del Atlantico - Ponedera
 Ponedera official website

Municipalities of Atlántico Department